The 'European Association for International Education (EAIE) is a European centre for expertise, networking and resources in the internationalisation of higher education. It is a non-profit, member-led organisation serving individuals actively involved in the internationalisation of their institutions through training, conferences, research and knowledge acquisition and sharing. The EAIE is based in Amsterdam, the Netherlands and has approximately 2500 members from 80 different countries,  the majority of which are located in Europe.

History 
In the late 1980s, European international educators realised the need for a European member association dedicated to those working in the field of international education. In 1989 the EAIE was created due to the Founding Conference in Amsterdam, the Netherlands. The Conference attracted around 600 professionals inspired by the idea of joining a network of international educators. 
The original working title of the Association was 'European Association for International Education Administrators. However, this was later changed to the European Association for International Education when the organisation was officially created.

Conferences 
The EAIE Annual Conference is the primary event through which the Association brings professionals to discuss the latest trends in international education. The conference is the largest international higher education event of its kind in Europe and is hosted in a different European city each year. In 2022 it was held in Barcelona.

Publications 
The EAIE publishes various publications on topics concerning the internationalisation of higher education.

Forum magazine is the flagship member magazine of the Association, published three times per year, with a readership of circa 2500. The first issue of Forum was published in 1999. In 2012, the magazine incorporated a thematic approach, tackling one prominent topic within international education per issue.

EAIE Occasional Papers are published on average once per year and consist of more detailed explorations of a specific topic, published in book format. The first Occasional Paper was published in 1992, entitled 'Mass higher education in Europe: implications for student mobility and international education. By 2014, the EAIE had published 23 Occasional Papers.

The Internationalisation of Higher Education Handbook is published jointly by the EAIE and RAABE Publishers. The Handbook provides case studies, advice and references for those actively working to internationalise their institution, with supplements published three times per year. The article's length ranges from 5000 to 7500 words.

The Journal of Studies in International Education is a peer-reviewed journal for higher education administrators, educators, researchers and policymakers. Volumes are published five times per year and articles vary from 4000 to 6000 words in length. The EAIE is part of the Association for Studies in International Education (ASIE) which is responsible for the Journal.

Other activities 
The EAIE provides other activities for its members, such as a Mentorship programme, the Train the Trainers programme, and its advocacy work aiming to effect positive change in higher education internationalisation. In 2012, the EAIE led a working group of international higher education associations to develop a charter advocating international students' rights. The EAIE has also been involved in developing a global network of centralised student data depositories to make digital student data portability a reality.

Governance 
The EAIE leadership comprises the President, Vice-President, Executive Director, Board and General Council. The Board (which includes the President and Vice-President) works to guide the Association's future by monitoring the strategy's implementation as determined by the General Council. The General Council is responsible for the organisation's long-term vision, budget and accounts. Elections for positions in the EAIE leadership are held once every two years.

Past EAIE Presidents include:
 2014–2016 Laura Howard, Spain
 2012–2014 Hans-Georg van Liempd, the Netherlands
 2010–2012 Gudrun Paulsdottir, Iceland
 2008–2010 Bjørn Einar Aas, Norway
 2007–2008 Fiona Hunter, Italy
 2005–2007 Antoinette Charon Wauters, Switzerland
 2003–2004 Jeroen Torenbeek, the Netherlands
 2002 Tim Birtwistle, UK
 2001 Wedigo de Vivanco, Germany
 2000 Joan-Anton Carbonell, UK
 1999 Iris Schwanck, France
 1998 Linda Johnson, the Netherlands
 1997 Giancarlo Spinelli, Italy
 1996 Marianne Hildebrand, Sweden
 1995 Eva Haberfellner, Germany
 1994 Hans de Wit, the Netherlands
 1993 France Gamerre, France
 1992 Kjetil Flatin, Norway
 1991 Maria Sticchi Damiani, Italy
 1990 Axel Markert, Germany

See also 

 International education
 List of higher education associations and alliances
 NAFSA: Association of International Educators

References 

Higher education organisations based in Europe
Non-profit organisations based in the Netherlands